Brielle Davis (born 1984) is an Australian recording artist, known for her song "Serial Thriller" (2006) which reached the top 50 on the ARIA Singles chart.

Biography

Brielle Davis' mother is Anne and they lived in Sylvania. Growing up she played netball and performed jazz dancing. In 1996 Davis signed with ICAM Records and released her self-titled debut album, Brielle, at age 12, with Mark Bryan producing. In 1997 the artist appeared in the documentary, The Fame Game, which dealt with "professional and personal costs of sudden and intense notoriety."

She released a cover version of Graeme Connors's track, "September's Sweet Child" (January 1998). In mid-1998 she released Brielle via LGM/Columbia and distributed by Sony Music Australia. Entertainment magazine, Billboards Christie Eliezer and Glenn A. Baker noted Davis as an "artist to watch." Rosie's Reviews author observed, "instrumentation on this 12 track album is faultless, as are the vocals... however I will be far more interested in what she does in several years time."

Davis was nominated for New Talent of the Year at the 1999 Country Music Awards of Australia, making her the youngest nominee ever for the Golden Guitar Award. She was the first performer to sing the Australian National Anthem at Stadium Australia. Davis was a NSW semi-finalist in the 1999 and 2000 Young Australian of the Year Awards and was a semi-finalist on Australian Idol singing "Even God Must Get The Blues".

Davis returned in 2006 with her first studio release since 1998's "Girl's in Love". "Serial Thriller" (co-written by Divinyls' front woman Chrissy Amphlett) debuted on the ARIA chart at No. 44. The song had an electro-rock beat, contrasting Davis' older material. The single's B-side, "Oxygen", was a DNA remix of a proposed album's track.

The follow-up single "Take It Off" was released in March 2007 and peaked at #11 on the ARIA Club Chart after remix treatment by US house producer Andy Caldwell. It also gained national airplay as part of the Nova network's Unsigned initiative and in radio ads for the Leukemia Foundation's World's Greatest Shave campaign. A second album, The Other Side, was proposed in May 2007 but was not released. In the following month Davis toured Solomon Islands, supporting Jet, to entertain Australian troops stationed there for Operation Anode. An extended play, Crossing the Line, was released later in 2007. It featured acoustic versions of "Serial Thriller", "Oxygen", The Other Sides unreleased tracks "Cybersexual" and "Mine". plus new tracks, "Crossing the Line", "Bang Bang". 

In early 2008, Davis was one of a group of entertainers who toured and performed for Australian troops in Iraq and Afghanistan. The tour was covered on Australian Story on ABC1 as a two-part documentary. In July-September 2009 she took the role of Elaine Harper in the play Arsenic and Old Lace at Cronulla's Arts Theatre. In 2012 Davis, on lead vocals and guitar, joined alternative Country, Americana band, Not Good with Horses. The group issued it debut album, Faultlines, on 29 March 2018.

Discography

Albums

Extended plays

Singles

References

External links

Official website archived from the original on 30 March 2018. Accessed on 7 June 2022.
Official Photographs

1984 births
Living people
Australian child singers
Australian Idol
Musicians from Sydney
21st-century Australian singers
21st-century Australian women singers